Highway 35 is a highway in south-central Israel.  It runs roughly from west to east.  It begins in Ashkelon, passes through the Lakhish region and Kiryat Gat, crosses the Green Line and terminates at a junction with Highway 60 near Hebron.  Highway 35 is 58 km long.  The road follows the "Lachish Road", an ancient east–west trade route connecting the Via Maris and the Way of the Patriarchs.

Junctions and interchanges on the highway

References

See also
List of highways in Israel

35